Wendy B. Max is a professor of Health Economics and the director of the Institute for Health & Aging in the School of Nursing at the University of California, San Francisco.  Her focus is on the cost of illness and she has done important work on the cost of smoking-related illness.

A native of Summit, New Jersey, Wendy was an undergraduate at Stanford University.  She went on to earn her Ph.D. in economics at the University of Colorado at Boulder.  She currently lives in Palo Alto, California with her husband and three sons.

Prominent publications include:

2004 Froelicher ES, Sohn M, Max W, Bacchetti P. Women's initiative for nonsmoking VII: Evaluation of health service utilization and costs among women smokers with cardiovascular disease. Journal of Cardiopulmonary Rehabilitation 2004; 24: 218–228.

2004 Max W, Rice DP, Finkelstein E, Bardwell RA, Leadbetter MS. The economic toll of intimate partner violence against women in the United States, 1995. Violence and Victims 19(3): 259–72.

2004 Max W, Rice DP, Sung H-Y, Zhang X, Miller L. The economic burden of smoking in California. Tobacco Control 2004; 13: 264–67.

External links
The Institute for Health and Aging Official Web Site.

Year of birth missing (living people)
Living people
University of California, San Francisco faculty
Stanford University alumni
University of Colorado alumni